The Flora of the Coral Sea Islands consists of 16 families, 24 genera and 26 species. Five of these species are introduced and naturalised. The vegetation is mostly herbfields, although a few islands support shrubs and low forests.

The following plant taxa occur on the Coral Sea Islands:

References